Pine Ridge Church (Pine Ridge Presbyterian Church) is a historic church in Pine Ridge, Mississippi, north of Natchez.

The church was started by the Evangelist Rev James Smylie in 1807 as the Washington Presbyterian Church. Washington was that time the Territorial Capital of the old Southwest territory. In 1808 the church moved to a rural community and the name changed to Salem Church. It is the oldest Presbyterian congregation in Mississippi. In 1827 the name was changed to Pine Ridge Presbyterian Church.  It was built in 1829 and added to the National Register of Historic Places in 1979.  In 1908 a tornado destroyed the first building.  Pine Ridge is a member of the Presbyterian Church in America.

References

Churches on the National Register of Historic Places in Mississippi
Federal architecture in Mississippi
Colonial Revival architecture in Mississippi
Churches completed in 1829
19th-century Presbyterian church buildings in the United States
Presbyterian Church in America churches in Mississippi
National Register of Historic Places in Natchez, Mississippi
1829 establishments in Mississippi